Andy McDonald (27 December 1885 – 12 May 1967) was an Australian rules footballer who played for Carlton in the Victorian Football League (VFL) during the 1910s.

McDonald was recruited to Carlton from Yarraville and kicked 19 goals in his debut season. He would play in a losing Grand Final at the end of the year, the first of four VFL Grand Finals that he appeared in. Premierships came in 1914 and 1915, while he was a member of the Carlton team which lost the 1916 premiership decider.

References

Holmesby, Russell and Main, Jim (2007). The Encyclopedia of AFL Footballers. 7th ed. Melbourne: Bas Publishing.
Blueseum profile

1885 births
Carlton Football Club players
Carlton Football Club Premiership players
Yarraville Football Club players
Australian rules footballers from Melbourne
1967 deaths
Two-time VFL/AFL Premiership players
People from Footscray, Victoria